Greece–New Zealand relations are foreign relations between Greece and New Zealand. Greece is accredited to New Zealand from its embassy in Canberra, Australia. New Zealand has a non-resident ambassador in Rome, Italy.

History
Stemming from World War II, New Zealand forces fought alongside the Greeks in continental Greece and Crete since then, Greece has claimed a special relationship with New Zealand. An under-equipped force made-up of largely New Zealand, Australian, British and Greek troops fought to protect the island from invasion.  The invasion of Crete by German paratroops began on 20 May 1941 and ended seven days later with the evacuation of 16,500 Commonwealth troops.  Allied losses in the Battle of Crete numbered 15,743.  New Zealand casualties were 671 killed and 967 wounded, while 2,180 were taken prisoner. The Battle of Crete is commemorated every year in both Crete and New Zealand. Prime Minister Helen Clark led a large party from New Zealand to Crete in May 2001 to attend the 60th anniversary of the battle. The Minister of Foreign Affairs, Hon Phil Goff, attended anniversary celebrations in May 2003 and Hon Annette King in May 2006.
The war was followed by a modest wave of Greek emigration to New Zealand. In the 2006 census 2,547 people primarily identified themselves as being Greek. A bilateral Social Security Agreement came into force on 1 April 1994.

In May 2007, New Zealand hosted Prime Minister Kostas Karamanlis for a short visit – the first-ever by a Greek Prime Minister to New Zealand.

As part of an effort to redeploy resources in Europe, New Zealand closed its embassy in Athens in 1991, since when it has been represented in Greece through its embassy in Rome which is accredited accordingly. It does still retain an honorary consulate general in Athens, however.  There are also Honorary Greek Consulates in Auckland and Wellington. The Greek Embassy in Wellington opened in 1999 and suspended operations in 2015, after a review following the Greek government-debt crisis.

Relations
The prevailing climate in political relations between Greece and New Zealand was demonstrated in 2002 by the visit of the President of the Hellenic Republic to Wellington, which confirmed the excellent state of relations between the two countries.

New Zealand and Greece are in the final stages of signing a Working Holiday Scheme between both nations.

Social Security Agreement 
The social security agreement between the governments of New Zealand and Greece allows former residents of either country access to certain benefits and pensions under the other country's social security system.

Greek tours by New Zealand delegates and ministers

New Zealand tours by Greek delegates and ministers

Greek Ministerial Visits to New Zealand

See also 
 Foreign relations of Greece
 Foreign relations of New Zealand
 Greeks in New Zealand

References

External links 
 Greek Ministry of Foreign Affaires about relations with New Zealand
 New Zealand Ministry of Foreign Affairs and Trade about relations with Greece

 
Greece
New Zealand